Cechenena helops is a moth of the family Sphingidae first described by Francis Walker in 1856. It is found in Malaysia (Peninsular, Sarawak, Sabah), Indonesia (Sumatra, Java, Kalimantan, Seram, Papua New Guinea), the Philippines (Palawan, Balabac), Nepal, north-eastern India, Thailand, south-western China and Vietnam.

Description 
Adults are grey green with a large oval olive-brown spot at the base of the forewing upperside.

Biology 
Larvae have been recorded feeding on Tetracera species.

Subspecies
Cechenena helops helops (Malaysia (Peninsular, Sarawak, Sabah), Indonesia (Sumatra, Java, Kalimantan), the Philippines (Palawan, Balabac), Nepal, north-eastern India, Thailand, south-western China, Vietnam) 
Cechenena helops interposita Joicey & Talbot, 1921 (Seram)
Cechenena helops papuana Rothschild & Jordan, 1903 (Papua Barat and Papua New Guinea)

References

Cechenena
Moths described in 1903